Spirit of the Age and The Dream Goes On are two triple CD anthologies released in 2008 covering the periods 1976-84 and 1985-97 of the British rock group Hawkwind.

They were released on Atomhenge Records, a subsidiary of Cherry Red Records, which was dedicated to re-releasing Hawkwind's catalogue from the years 1976 to 1997. These anthologies preceded the release of the re-mastered albums which feature bonus tracks.

Spirit of the Age (Anthology 1976-84)

Disc 1
"Reefer Madness" [full version] (Robert Calvert, Dave Brock) – Astounding Sounds, Amazing Music – this version previously unreleased
"Kadu Flyer" (Nik Turner, Simon House) – Astounding Sounds, Amazing Music
"Steppenwolf" (Calvert, Brock) – Astounding Sounds, Amazing Music
"Kerb Crawler" (Calvert, Brock) – Astounding Sounds, Amazing Music
"Back on the Streets" (Calvert, Paul Rudolph) – single A-side
"The Dream of Isis" (Brock, House, Simon King) – "Back on the Streets" single B-side
"Quark, Strangeness and Charm" (Calvert, Brock) – Quark, Strangeness and Charm
"Spirit of the Age" (Calvert, Brock) – Quark, Strangeness and Charm
"Damnation Alley" (Calvert, Brock, House) – Quark, Strangeness and Charm
"Hassan i Sabbah" (Calvert, Rudolph) – Quark, Strangeness and Charm
"Over the Top" (Calvert, Brock) – Sonic Assassins
"The Golden Void" (Brock) – Sonic Assassins
"Psi Power" (Calvert, Brock) – 25 Years On

Disc 2
"25 Years" [alternate mix] (Brock) – 25 Years On – this version previously unreleased
"Freefall" [non-cross-faded mix] (Calvert, Harvey Bainbridge) – 25 Years On – this version previously unreleased
"The Only Ones" [non-cross-faded mix] (Calvert, Brock) – 25 Years On – this version previously unreleased
"Uncle Sam's on Mars" (Calvert, Brock, House, King) – PXR5
"Jack of Shadows" (Calvert, House, Adrian Shaw) – PXR5
"High Rise" (Calvert, House) – PXR5
"Robot" (Calvert, Brock) – PXR5
"Shot Down in the Night" [live] [single version] (Steve Swindells) – Live Seventy Nine
"Brainstorm" [live] (Turner) – Live Seventy Nine
"Motorway City" (Brock) – Levitation
"Levitation" (Brock) – Levitation
"Space Chase" (Huw Lloyd-Langton) – Levitation
"Who's Gonna Win The War?" [single version] (Brock) – Levitation
"Nuclear Toy" (Brock, Lloyd-Langton) – "Who's Gonna Win the War?" single B-side
"Transdimensional Man" (Brock) – "Angels of Death" single B-side

Disc 3
"Angels of Death" [alternate single version] (Brock) – Sonic Attack – this version previously unreleased
"Rocky Paths" (Lloyd-Langton) – Sonic Attack
"Virgin of the World" (Bainbridge) – Sonic Attack
"Nuclear Drive" (Brock) – Church of Hawkwind
"Some People Never Die" (Brock) – Church of Hawkwind
"The Psychedelic Warlords" (Brock) – "Silver Machine" single B-side
"Silver Machine" [single version] (Calvert, Brock) – Choose Your Masques
"Choose Your Masks" (Michael Moorcock, Brock) – Choose Your Masques
"Dream Worker" (Bainbridge) – Choose Your Masques
"Waiting for Tomorrow" (Lloyd-Langton) – Choose Your Masques
"Arrival in Utopia" (Moorcock, Brock) – Choose Your Masques
"Utopia `84" [live] (Brock) – Zones
"Social Alliance" [live] (Brock) – Zones
"Dragons and Fables" (Lloyd-Langton) – The Earth Ritual Preview EP
"Night of the Hawks" (Brock) – The Earth Ritual Preview EP
"Stonehenge Decoded" [live] (Brock) – This Is Hawkwind, Do Not Panic
"Orgone Accumulator" [live] (Calvert, Brock) – Undisclosed Files Addendum

The Dream Goes On (Anthology 1985-97)

Disc 1
"Song of the Swords" (Brock) – The Chronicle of the Black Sword
"Shade Gate" (Bainbridge) – The Chronicle of the Black Sword
"Needle Gun" (Brock) – The Chronicle of the Black Sword
"Zarozinia" (Kris Tait, Brock) – The Chronicle of the Black Sword
"Master of the Universe" [live] (Turner, Brock) – Live Chronicles
"Dreaming City" [live] (Lloyd-Langton) – Live Chronicles
"Moonglum" [live] (Lloyd-Langton) – Live Chronicles
"Elric the Enchanter" [live] (Brock, Alan Davey) – Live Chronicles
"Conjuration of Magnu" [live] (Brock) – Live Chronicles
"Magnu" [live] (Brock) – Live Chronicles
"Dust of Time" [live] (Brock, Bainbridge, Lloyd-Langton) – Live Chronicles
"Cajun Jinx" (Bainbridge, Brock, Davey, Danny Thompson) – Out and Intake
"The War I Survived" (Roger Neville-Neil, Brock) – The Xenon Codex
"Heads" (Neville-Neil, Brock) – The Xenon Codex
"Lost Chronicles" (Bainbridge) – The Xenon Codex
"Wastelands of Sleep" (Tait, Brock) – The Xenon Codex
"Wings" (Davey) – Space Bandits
"Ship of Dreams" (Brock) – Space Bandits
"T.V. Suicide" (Bainbridge) – Space Bandits

Disc 2
"Images" (Bridget Wishart, Brock, Davey) – Space Bandits
"Back in the Box" (Wishart, Brock, Bainbrige, Davey, Richard Chadwick) – Palace Springs
"Treadmill" (Brock) – Palace Springs
"Assault and Battery" (listed as "Lives of Great Men") [live] (Brock) – Palace Springs
"The Golden Void" (listed as "Void of Golden Light") [live] (Brock) – Palace Springs
"Eons" (a.k.a. "Snake Dance") [live] (Brock, Bainbrige, Davey, Chadwick) – California Brainstorm
"Ejection" [live] (Calvert) – California Brainstorm
"LSD" (Davey, Chadwick) – Electric Tepee
"Mask of Morning" (Brock) – Electric Tepee
"The Secret Agent" (Brock) – Electric Tepee
"Letting in the Past" (a.k.a. "Looking in the Future") (Brock) – It Is the Business of the Future to Be Dangerous
"The Camera That Could Lie" (Brock) – It Is the Business of the Future to Be Dangerous

Disc 3
"Space is Their (Palestine)" (Brock) – It Is the Business of the Future to Be Dangerous
"The Dream Goes On" (a.k.a. "The Iron Dream") [live] (Brock, Davey, Chadwick) – The Business Trip
"Right to Decide" [live] (Brock, Davey) – The Business Trip
"The Dream Has Ended" (a.k.a. "You Know You're Only Dreaming") [live] (Brock, Davey, Chadwick) – The Business Trip
"This Future" (a.k.a. "Welcome to the Future") [live] (Calvert) – The Business Trip
"White Zone" (Brock) – White Zone
"Sputnik Stan" (Davey) – Alien 4
"Death Trap" (Calvert, Brock) – Alien 4
"Alien I Am" [The Roswell Edit] (Brock) – Area S4 EP
"Love in Space" (Brock) – Love in Space EP
"Lord of Light" [live] (Brock) – Love in Space EP
"Distant Horizons" (Brock, Chadwick) – Distant Horizons
"Phetamine Street" (Ron Tree) – Distant Horizons
"Waimeia Canyon Drive" (Brock) – Distant Horizons
"Alchemy" (Jerry Richards, Chadwick) – Distant Horizons

External links
Atomhenge Records

Hawkwind compilation albums
Compilation album series
2008 compilation albums